Desert Nights (also known as Thirst) is a 1929 American silent adventure/romantic drama film starring John Gilbert, Ernest Torrence, and Mary Nolan. Directed by William Nigh, the film is the last silent film starring John Gilbert.

Plot
A gang of thieves rob an African diamond company of diamonds worth $500,000, with two of its members posing as Lord and Lady Stonehill (who are expected to pay a visit). They kidnap its manager, Hugh Rand, and head into the "Calahari" Desert. After a few days in the sweltering heat, three of the crooks decide to take their chances in Cape Town instead and demand their share of the loot. Steve ("Lord Stonehill") gives them worthless glass.

He and Diana ("Lady Stonehill") keep going, taking Hugh with them. When their native porters desert, however, the thieves are forced to rely on Hugh to guide them. He gains the upper hand as they trek through the hostile desert with very little water. Later, one of the other crooks returns and tells them that the other two died from drinking from a poisoned waterhole, before succumbing himself. Steve reveals he poisoned the water to deter pursuit. Hugh keeps tensions high by romancing Diana, infuriating Steve. As they get thirstier and thirstier, a parched Diana offers Hugh first the diamonds, then herself, in exchange for some of the water. When he rejects both, she even offers to be his slave, but with the same result. Eventually, they reach a safe waterhole.

However, Hugh has been leading them in a circle, and they finally end up back at the diamond company office. Steve is first introduced to the real Lord and Lady Stonehill, before being taken away. Diana's fate is left in Hugh's hands. He tells her she is free, except that she will have to report to him every day for the rest of her life. Then he embraces her.

Cast
 John Gilbert as Hugh Rand
 Ernest Torrence as Steve / Lord Stonehill
 Mary Nolan as Lady Diana Stonehill
 Claude King as the real Lord Stonehill (uncredited)

Reception
Mordaunt Hall, critic for The New York Times, gave the film a favorable review, writing that "incredible though this adventure may be, it happens to be one that holds the interest." Nolan "gives a good performance", Gilbert "gives an earnest showing as Rand" and "Mr. Torrance is capital as Steve."

Status
Desert Nights survives and is available for download or DVD purchase from The Warner Bros. Archives collection site.

References

External links
 
 
 
 

1929 films
1929 adventure films
1929 romantic drama films
American adventure films
American black-and-white films
American romantic drama films
American silent feature films
Films directed by William Nigh
Films set in Africa
Films set in South Africa
Films set in Namibia
Films set in deserts
Films shot in California
Metro-Goldwyn-Mayer films
1920s American films
Silent romantic drama films
Silent adventure films
Silent American drama films